Revenge of the Mummy, officially named Revenge of the Mummy: The Ride, is an indoor roller coaster/dark ride/haunted attraction located at Universal Studios Florida, Universal Studios Hollywood, and Universal Studios Singapore. The Florida and Singapore locations have the same track layout, and each location offers a slightly different virtual experience. The three attractions were manufactured by Premier Rides and feature track switches installed by Dynamic Structures. Universal Creative and ITEC Entertainment Corporation created the theme at each location, with Adirondack Studios responsible for several of unique elements implemented at the Singapore location.

History
In 2002, Universal Parks & Resorts set about designing a dark ride based on the popular Mummy movie franchise. As part of this process, Universal Studios Florida closed Kongfrontation on September 8, 2002, and Universal Studios Hollywood closed E.T. Adventure on March 14, 2003. On May 21, 2004, Revenge of the Mummy opened at Universal Studios Florida. This was followed by the opening of the ride at Universal Studios Hollywood on June 25, 2004.

In December 2008, Resorts World Sentosa, which now encompasses Universal Studios Singapore, announced a Revenge of the Mummy ride would be built at the park, due to open in 2010. In contrast to the previous two installations, the one at Universal Studios Singapore was cheaper, reportedly costing only US$20 million instead of US$90
 million. On March 18, 2010, the ride officially opened to the public.

Universal Studios Florida

Revenge of the Mummy opened on May 21, 2004. This Revenge of the Mummy roller coaster uses three LIM launches to propel riders from a complete standstill. At the end of the ride there is an area where guests may purchase a photo of themselves on the ride from a Mummy-themed gift shop titled "Sahara Traders", which replaced Kongfrontation's "Safari Outfitters" gift shop.

The six-story,  building housing the roller coaster was previously home to one of Universal's landmark attractions, Kongfrontation. Homages to the Kong attraction can be found in several areas within Revenge of the Mummy, including a golden statue of King Kong in the second scene of the ride. The slabs used to construct the building were the largest of its kind ever used. Track pieces from Kongfrontation were built into the building during construction and parts of the track still remain within the building. In order to compensate for space, part of the building was excavated several feet deep for the ride's climactic drop.

Queue and pre-show
Guests enter the ride by entering the massive Museum of Antiquities facade, browsing through the film setup of a fictional sequel titled Revenge of the Mummy. The film's props, molds, and concept drawings are on display inside. TVs around the studio play a video explaining how the original Mummy film was made, and most importantly how the film's fictional curse seemingly was proven to be real while filming, with various accidents and plagues striking the cast and crew.  Brendan Fraser is skeptical, though, and refuses to wear the medjai symbol that the crew and locals are convinced will protect them from the curse. Fraser steals crew member Reggie's medjai necklace and demands a coffee (which craft services would not serve him before since he was not wearing the medjai symbol). Reggie injures himself in a freak accident later in the video, and then is seen being trapped inside a sarcophagus prop in the background near the end of the video. The inside queue morphs into a 1940s archaeological dig inside an Egyptian tomb, where guests climb to the second floor to board mine carts utilizing individual lap bars.

Ride description

Cast
 Brendan Fraser as Rick O'Connell
 Arnold Vosloo as Imhotep
 Michael Lawson as Reggie
 Rachel Weisz as Evelyn O'Connell
 The Rock as The Scorpion King
 Robert Steinman Elden as John Shippman
 Stephen Sommers as Himself
 Zelda Rubinstein as Herself

Summary
As the ride begins, the mine carts move into another room inside Imhotep's tomb, where Reggie (a "Revenge of the Mummy" crew member who was missing on the set) is seen partly mummified and warns the riders: "Are you insane?! Get out of here! The curse is real; this whole place is a trap! He's after your souls!" Before Reggie can finish, Imhotep then comes out of a sarcophagus, prompting Reggie to desperately instruct the riders, "Look for the medjai symbol. It's your only hope!", but Imhotep cuts him off, shouting, "Silence!", and sucking out Reggie's soul, and then reminds the riders, "With your souls, I shall rule for all eternity!"

The cars next move into a second room where there is treasure on the left and right sides of the car. Imhotep appears from the sand in front of a tomb mural and tempts riders, "Serve me and savor riches beyond measure". Light appears across the room, revealing treasure around the room. Imhotep also sternly states, "or refuse, and savor a more bitter treasure." Soldier mummies appear in front of the treasure as he utters an Egyptian curse: "Akudei makrraken ra!!". The cart then quickly moves into another room where the mine cart approaches the first launch and "hits" a wall and scarab beetles come "pouring out" of a wall in front of the riders. The cart launches backwards as a screaming sound effect is heard. The cart then drops into another room where it stops.

Imhotep appears again on a screen above the riders, moving across the screen to the back of the room, while the ride vehicle turns 180 degrees to follow him. Imhotep warns "Not even the medjai can save you now. There is no escape. Your end shall be my beginning. Behold your fate. Will this be your destiny?" Then, the ride moves through the second launch and catapults guests to 40 mph while Imhotep shouts: "YOUR SOULS ARE MINE!!!" The mine cart passes through Imhotep's skull (a fog display) and drops through various turns, while speeding past projections of mummies and fire.

The cart comes to a stop after this, and a female ride attendant appears behind a glassed control booth and thanks them for riding, but Imhotep sucks out her soul, breaks the glass, and sets the ceiling on fire while shouting "Prepare to forfeit your souls! Death is only the beginning!" The cart then hits the last launch, drops down 39 ft (the highest drop in the ride) and goes down a winding drop until a medjai symbol appears while Imhotep shouts "NOOOOO!" as the vehicle passes through the medjai symbol.

Then passengers travel through a tunnel of flickering lights with a screen in front of them. Brendan Fraser (dressed as Rick O'Connell) appears and tells the riders, "Hey, welcome back! Hope you enjoyed yourself. I would have enjoyed this interview a lot more if I HAD GOTTEN MY CUP OF COFFEE!!!" Suddenly, a cape passes over the screen and Imhotep's arm offers Fraser a cup of coffee. As Fraser screams and falls back in his chair, the screen fades to black, while riders hear Imhotep roaring over Fraser's screams, ending the ride. Riders are then directed to exit through an actual unload station. At the exit of the ride, riders see a missing persons poster with a picture of Reggie on it.

Incident

On September 21, 2004, a 39-year-old man fell four feet from the ride's loading platform onto the tracks below while boarding the front row. He died the following morning during an operation to remove his spleen. The death was ruled accidental by the local medical examiner's office.

Universal Studios Hollywood
The ride opened on June 25, 2004. The roller coaster has a height restriction of 48 inches. Revenge of the Mummy uses linear induction motors (LIM), a technology used to launch riders. The roller coaster lasts approximately 2 minutes and is housed in the building of the former attraction, the E.T. Adventure.

The ride features warrior mummies, treasures and tombs, a sudden launch, a scarab beetle attack, forwards and backwards motion and surround sound speakers inside the vehicles. Hollywood's coaster was built in the former E.T. Adventure building. Some support beams for the coaster were built by digging downward to accommodate space. Actual props from film series, including their replicated versions can be found in this incarnation; notably the warrior mummies and treasures.

Queue and pre-show
Set in 1944, the queue provides riders with a brief backstory of Imhotep and the ride in general. Once guests enter the building's corridor in to the ride, they first see a hole which air will blast out of every 10 to 15 seconds (there are further traps along the corridor.) When guest move further in, the Book of the Dead is seen. A peep hole is also seen, fenced up by wires, containing a mummified man in his sarcophagus and other mummified remains of people whom Imhotep may have sucked their souls out earlier. The man's mummy is surrounded by carnivorous scarab beetles. When guests move deeper into the building (now appearing to be a tomb), they find an abandoned archaeological dig which is actually Imhotep's burial chamber. Looking up ahead in a giant mirror is a pictogram of Imhotep grinning at the guest followed by another pictogram of the guest being chased by Imhotep's army of mummy soldiers. Further in, riders find an archaeological dig set in a backdrop of 1944. The queue ends in an Ancient Egyptian themed loading platform, complete with hieroglyphs and a large statue of a scarab beetle, in which the riders board mine cart-type coasters.

Ride
As the ride begins, riders enter a dark tomb lit with dark green and red fluorescent lights, with a mummy coming to life to the left and hissing at riders. From above, Omid Djalili's character the Warden Gad Hassan, from The Mummy film (who was thought to have met his fate in the first film), warns guests "Run for your lives! The curse is real! Imhotep lives!" He screams as scarab beetles engulf him. The mine car continues through to a dark chamber, as drops of water fall on guests, and mummies stretch their arms out from each side of the cart while mummified arms appear from the ceiling, trying to grab riders.

The mine car slowly continues into the treasure room, filled with large amounts of golden yellow light, Egyptian hieroglyphs covering the walls, and two gigantic statues of Anubis stationed next to a projector screen, where Imhotep appears from sand in a mural and tells guests, "Serve me and savor the riches of eternal life." The mine car makes a sharp turn as the yellow room quickly turns a dark shade of green, Imhotep continues his monologue... "And join us in eternal death." The mine car moves into the grand gallery as an animatronic Imhotep continues to speak a curse in Egyptian language "Akum ra, akum de," before exclaiming "Now your souls belong to me... FOREVER!" At the same time, the grand gallery starts to collapse after Imohtep used the powerful curse from the Scroll of Osiris. A wall behind him collapses, forming an eclipse as four more mummy warriors drop down from each side of the track, holding cutlasses in their hands.

The car is then launched at a high speed into darkness as the ride photo is taken. The surround sound speakers in the mine cart provide riders with an added dimension of entertainment, as the sound score begins. The ride continues for 56 seconds in darkness, going around high banked turns and small drops. Various images of mummy warriors and Imhotep are illuminated with ultraviolet lighting as the car twists and turns. The mine car makes a sharp uphill movement and veers left, where the track viciously brakes in a corner. The second launch is located in this area. Scarab beetles appear on the walls in front of the car with help of projectors, as the added special effects of air jets at riders' feet and a spray of water from above create the illusion of the vehicle being overrun by the bugs. As a screaming sound effect is heard, the car launches backwards into the underworld as Imhotep's evil laugh roars on the soundtrack. The vehicle makes a few more twists and turns, while more images of Imhotep and the mummy warriors are lit up as it continues backwards and Imhotep reminds riders "There's no place to hide! Your souls are MINE!"

The car slows suddenly under the last illuminated painting of Imhotep's outstretched grasp and moves slowly into another room. A turntable moves the car into a forward-facing position as fog machines and strobe lighting fill the blackened room. As the car faces forward once again, Imhotep appears as a projected image and screams "NOOOOO!" hauntingly at riders before vanishing. There is a second of uncertain silence before a floodlight hits riders, and as a wall lifts up into the ceiling to allow the car to pass through, a second strobe light blinds guests. Imhotep's curse is broken as the ride enters the loading platform.

Modifications 
Originally, the ride featured faux-fire and projection effects during the final encounter with Imhotep, engulfing the ride vehicle in pressurized steam and specialized lighting. The ride now uses strobe effects, with a brief pause before the false wall rises on the loading platform.

Universal Studios Singapore

Revenge of the Mummy was opened on March 18, 2010 with the soft opening of the park. This Revenge of the Mummy roller coaster is nearly identical and  almost follows Universal Studios Florida version with differences aside from exchanging the medjai medallion for Book Of The Living. However, the Singapore version includes a different storyline with new sounds and effects, as well as a new ending featuring Imhotep being sealed inside his tomb.
The ride's new theming was designed by Adirondack Studios, ITEC Entertainment Corp and Universal Creative.

Queue and pre-show
Unlike the Orlando version of the ride, guests enter an Egyptian tomb directly. Props from the Mummy film franchise and wall paintings of Imhotep's life as a high priest are featured in the inner queue areas similar to the Orlando version of the ride. When you are about to walk up the staircase, a sign that fades in and tells riders 'Find the gold Book Of The Living, Destroy Imhotep's Curse'. At the loading station, guests board mine cars utilizing individual lap bars.

Ride
As the ride begins with mine cars move deeper into the tomb. The words "Find the Book" are scrawled over the walls. As the mine car turns, riders see Evelyn's supervisor trapped on a table. Before the supervisor can say his final words, Imhotep then comes out of a sarcophagus, prompting the supervisor to desperately instruct the riders,  the supervisor desperately instructs the riders, "Find the Book of the Living and kill Imhotep! It's your only hope!". but Imhotep cuts him off, shouting, "Silence!" and sucking out  the supervisor's soul, and then warns the riders,  "You will never find the book—your souls will be mine for all eternity." Outlines of the Book of the Living, on the walls at the left, glow in red. Almost identical to the Orlando version, the vehicle  move into a room with treasure all over. Imhotep appears from the sand in a tomb mural  tempts riders, "Serve me and savor riches beyond measure". Light appears across the room, revealing treasure around the room. Imhotep also  states, "or refuse, and savor a more bitter treasure." Soldier  mummies appear in front of the treasure as he utters an Egyptian curse "Akudei makrraken ra!!" Then the vehicle drops backwards and turns with an anti-clockwise 180-degree circle as the screaming sound effect is heard and Imhotep warns the riders: "You will never find the book. There is no escape. Your end shall be my beginning. Behold your fate!" Then the ride catapults guests to 40 mph while Imhotep shouts: "YOUR SOULS ARE MINE!!!" The vehicle accelerates up a hill as it goes through Imhotep's skull and drops through various turns past projections of mummies.

The vehicle comes to a stop after this, and riders will find the Book of the Living on a pedestal.  Imhotep's voice is heard saying, "Without this book, you will never stop me!" and he suddenly appears behind the book saying "Prepare to forfeit your souls!".  The ceiling of the room is engulfed in flames as Imhotep threatens the riders once again  opening the book  shouting "NOOOOO!" and causing the inscriptions to glow red. The vehicle moves forward and drops down "into hell" (the camera is located here) and goes down a winding drop before the brake run. Further on, riders "pass through" a wall and will see a sarcophagus hanging from the ceiling with Imhotep trapped inside. As the eyes of his Sarcophagus glow red, he shouts that the riders can never be defeated and taunts the riders with a warning,  “Hopeless fools! You can never defeat me, I will escape this little tomb. Death is only the beginning!”, followed by an evil laugh as the riders move on to the unload platform.

Comparison

Awards

Due to consistent 1st place awards, the best indoor roller coaster category has been retired and the ride has been given legendary status by the Golden Ticket Awards.

Accidents and incidents
He suffered injuries to his head and noted pain due to the fall. He was rushed to Orlando Regional Medical Center for surgery and died the next day.
 On September 23, 2004, a 67-year-old woman was injured when her arm became stuck between a handrail. The ride was temporarily shut down following an investigation and continued to resume normal operational hours after it was deemed safe.
 On November 18, 2007, a woman broke a vertebra in her lower back while riding the attraction.

See also
Flight of Fear, a similar ride at two Cedar Fair parks.

References

External links

Revenge of the Mummy: The Ride at Universal Studios Florida
Revenge of the Mummy: The Ride at Universal Studios Hollywood
Revenge of the Mummy at Universal Studios Singapore

Revenge of the Mummy Design News, December 13, 2004
Review at Theme Park Insider
Adirondack Studios official website

Amusement rides based on film franchises
Animatronic attractions
Buildings and structures in Los Angeles County, California
Enclosed roller coasters
Resorts World Sentosa
Roller coasters in Florida
Roller coasters in California
Roller coasters in Orlando, Florida
Roller coasters in Singapore
Roller coasters introduced in 2004
Roller coasters introduced in 2010
Roller coasters manufactured by Dynamic Structures
Roller coasters manufactured by Premier Rides
Roller coasters operated by Universal Parks & Resorts
Steel roller coasters
Southern Islands
Universal Parks & Resorts attractions by name
Universal Studios Florida
Universal Studios Hollywood
Universal Studios Singapore
Universal Studios Dubailand
Tourist attractions in Singapore
2004 establishments in Florida
2004 establishments in California
2010 establishments in Singapore

de:Revenge of the Mummy – The Ride